Jean-Baptiste Coste (1777–1809) was a French painter and friend of Jacques-Louis David. His children included the painter Louise Zoé Coste.

Bibliography 
 Principes élémentaires de lavis et d'aquarelles (avec J. Marchand), s.l.n.d.

Known works

Paintings 
 Ideal landscape with the basilica of Maxentius, 1791 (Musée des Beaux-Arts d'Orléans – shown at the Entre Lumières et romantisme exhibition at the Musée Jenisch (Vevey), from 16 March to 17 June 2007.
 Roman Altar, with inscription, late 18th century, Musée Grobet-Labadié, at Marseille
 Park with architecture, late 18th century, Musée Grobet-Labadié, at Marseille

1777 births
1809 deaths
18th-century French painters
French male painters
19th-century French painters
19th-century French male artists
18th-century French male artists